(January 2, 1912 – October 7, 1976) was a Japanese swimmer who competed at the 1932 Summer Olympics. There he won the gold medal in the 4 × 200 m freestyle relay event. He was born in Yamaguchi, Japan, and is the grandfather of three-time Olympian Kenji Watanabe.

References

profile

1912 births
1976 deaths
Olympic swimmers of Japan
Swimmers at the 1932 Summer Olympics
Olympic gold medalists for Japan
World record setters in swimming
Japanese male freestyle swimmers
Medalists at the 1932 Summer Olympics
Olympic gold medalists in swimming
20th-century Japanese people